The 2014 Liga Nusantara Papua season is the first edition of Liga Nusantara Papua is a qualifying round of the 2014 Liga Nusantara.

The competition scheduled starts on 5 May 2014.

Teams
This season there are 23 Papua club participants.

League table
Divided into four zones consisting of Merauke, Nabire, Jayapura and Wamena.

Result

References 

Papua